Events from the 1290s in England.

Incumbents
Monarch – Edward I

Events
1290
 21 May – the statute of quo warranto establishes the concept of time immemorial in English law, dating it to before the accession of Richard I of England in 1189.
 8 July – the statute Quia Emptores is passed, reforming the feudal system of land leases and allowing the sale of fee simple estates.
 18 July – the Edict of Expulsion is issued expelling all the Jews from England (at this time probably around 2,000) by 1 November.
 The second of the Statutes of Mortmain is passed under King Edward I, which prevents land from passing into possession of the church.
 Approximate date of construction of the Round Table at Winchester Castle by order of King Edward.
1291
 10 May – at Norham Castle, Edward forces the Scottish nobles to recognise his right to determine the succession to the throne of Scotland.
 8 August – twelve applicants submit their claims to the Scottish throne to Edward I.
 The Eleanor crosses are erected at Charing Cross and across England marking the route of the funeral procession Edward I's Queen, Eleanor of Castile.
 Construction of the nave of York Minster begins.
1292
 17 November – Edward I places John Balliol on the Scottish throne.
 Edward I reforms and standardises the system of legal education.
 Great Coxwell Barn is built; it will still be standing in the 21st century.
1293
 13 February – Robert Winchelsey elected as Archbishop of Canterbury, an office he will hold until his death in 1313.
 15 May – English fleet defeats a French force and sacks La Rochelle.
1294
 January – war breaks out between England and France when Philip IV of France attempts to seize Gascony from English control.
 14 May – Philip formally announces the confiscation of Gascony.
 June – Edward I takes direct control of the English wool trade (until 1297).
 24 August – Treaty of Nuremberg: England allies with the Holy Roman Empire against France.
 September – Madog ap Llywelyn leads a Welsh revolt against English rule.
 9 October – delayed by the Welsh revolt, an English army finally leaves to invade France.
 November – Edward I requires coastal towns to build ships for an expedition to France.
 Edward I demands from the Church a grant of one half of all clerical revenues.
1295 
 5 March – Battle of Maes Moydog: English defeat Welsh rebels.
 5 July – Scotland and France form the Auld Alliance against England.
 13 November – Edward I summons the Model Parliament to Westminster, the composition of which serves as a model for later parliaments.
1296
 30 March – Capture of Berwick: Edward I captures the town of Berwick-upon-Tweed from the Scots and sacks it.
 27 April –  at the Battle of Dunbar, the English defeat the Scots.
 August – Edward takes the Stone of Scone from Scotland to London.
 28 August – Scottish assembly pays homage to Edward at Berwick. Edward establishes a system of English rule over Scotland.
1297
 30 January – Edward I outlaws the clergy who have refused to pay his taxes due to an edict of Pope Boniface VIII.
 24 February – a parliament assembled at Salisbury refuses to endorse Edward's war in Gascony.
 May – William Wallace begins a Scottish rebellion against English rule.
 24 August – Edward I leaves England to support an invasion of France by the Flemish Count Guy of Dampierre.
 11 September – at the Battle of Stirling Bridge, the Scots under William Wallace defeat an English army.
 7 October – a truce is signed between England and France.
 10 October – Confirmation of Charters: Edward issues a statute reconfirming Magna Carta; copies are to be displayed in every cathedral.
1298
 22 July – at the Battle of Falkirk, Edward I defeats the Scottish army led by William Wallace.
 Rebuilding of Saint Stephen's Chapel at Westminster begins.
1299
 4 January – earthquake felt across the home counties.
 27 June – Pope Boniface VIII issues the papal bull Scimus Fili condemning King Edward I's invasion and occupation of Scotland.
 4 September – Edward I marries Marguerite, sister of King Philip IV.
 A fire damages the Palace of Westminster.

Births
1292
Henry Burghersh, statesman (died 1340)
 Eleanor de Clare, noblewoman (died 1337)
 John Grandisson, Bishop of Exeter (died 1369)
1293
Margaret de Clare, noblewoman (died 1342)
1295
 16 September – Elizabeth de Clare, noblewoman (died 1360)
Reginald de Cobham, 1st Baron Cobham (died 1361)
1297
Thomas Wake, 2nd Baron Wake of Liddell (died 1349)

Deaths
1290
 28 November – Eleanor of Castile, queen of Edward I of England (born 1241)
1291
 26 June – Eleanor of Provence, queen of Henry III of England (born c. 1223)
1292
 June? – Roger Bacon, philosopher and scientist (born c. 1220?)
 25 October – Robert Burnell, bishop and Lord Chancellor (born c. 1239)
 8 December – John Peckham, Archbishop of Canterbury (born c. 1230)
1295
 7 December – Gilbert de Clare, 6th Earl of Hertford, politician (born 1243)
1296
 May – William de Valence, 1st Earl of Pembroke (year of birth unknown)
 5 June – Edmund Crouchback, 1st Earl of Lancaster, son of Henry III of England (born 1245)
1297
 11 September – Hugh de Cressingham, treasurer (year of birth unknown)
 31 December – Humphrey de Bohun, 3rd Earl of Hereford, soldier (born 1249)
1298

 24 January – William the Hardy, Lord of Douglas (born 1243 in Scotland)

References